Lophophorini is a tribe of bird in the subfamily Phasianinae. It contains three genera of pheasant found throughout Asia. This grouping was supported by a 2021 phylogenetic analysis of Galliformes, and accepted by the International Ornithological Congress. The tribe name is accepted by the Howard and Moore Complete Checklist of the Birds of the World.

Species

References 

Bird tribes
Lophophorini